In biblical studies, the Urtext is the theorized original, uniform text of the Hebrew Bible (Tanakh), preceding both the Septuagint (LXX) and the Masoretic Text (MT). Since the 19th century there has been much scholarly work to regain this Urtext. The theory that there was an Urtext was advocated by Paul de Lagarde. Today it is disputed that there ever was such a uniform text.

See also
 Documentary hypothesis
 Supplementary hypothesis
 Q source

References

Biblical criticism
Early versions of the Bible
Hypothetical documents